The 2012 UNLV Rebels football team represented the University of Nevada, Las Vegas during the 2012 NCAA Division I FBS football season. The Rebels were led by third year head coach Bobby Hauck and played their home games at Sam Boyd Stadium. They were members of the Mountain West Conference. They finished the season 2–11, 2–6 in Mountain West play to finish in eighth place. This is the third straight year and seventh time in the last nine years that UNLV has finished with only 2 wins.

Schedule

Game summaries

Minnesota

Northern Arizona

This is the second straight year the Rebels were defeated by a team from the FCS after falling to Southern Utah in 2011.

Washington State

Air Force

at Utah State

at Louisiana Tech

Nevada

at Boise State

at San Diego State

New Mexico

at Colorado State

Wyoming

at Hawaii

References

UNLV
UNLV Rebels football seasons
UNLV Rebels football